John Daniel Murray Muir (27 December 1944 – 10 February 2018) was an Appeals Court justice at the Supreme Court of Queensland. He was appointed in 2007, after serving between 2002 and 2007 as a Commercial List Judge for the Supreme Court of Queensland. He was a law graduate of the University of Queensland.  His statutory retirement took effect on 27 December 2014.  Muir died on 10 February 2018.

References

1944 births
2018 deaths
Judges of the Supreme Court of Queensland
University of Queensland alumni
Recipients of the Centenary Medal